
Myriam Joire (born 1968 or 1969) is a technology writer in the United States, best known for her editorial and podcasting work on the website Engadget.

 Joire is the host of the Mobile Tech Podcast. She has also written for Chip Chick, Mobile Geeks, and has co-hosted "All About Android" on TWiT. She has also advised startups on media and product strategy.

Originally a video game programmer she became a writer/reviewer in 2010 with her blog tnkgrl Mobile, which led to her becoming a senior editor at Engadget.

She was a technology evangelist for the smart watch company Pebble Technology until October 2014.

Personal

Joire splits her time between San Francisco and Portland Oregon. She was born in Cannes, France, and moved to Canada in 1986, originally as an exchange student; she lived in London, Ontario and later moved to Vancouver. She was married from 1995 to 1997 and has since identified as trans and queer. She began transitioning in 1999.

References

Notable interviews and articles 
 Stephen Elop
 Myriam Joire - Pseudonyns and The Internet

External links
 Website

American bloggers
American women bloggers
Living people
Video game programmers
Women technology writers
University of Western Ontario alumni
Technology evangelists
French LGBT journalists
1960s births
People from Cannes
21st-century American women writers
American women podcasters
21st-century French women writers
Women in the video game industry